Denys Oleksandrovych Soroka (born 27 July 2001) is a Ukrainian professional footballer who plays as a left-back for Skoruk Tomakivka.

Career
In the summer 2022 he moved to Ukrainian First League club Skoruk Tomakivka. On 27 August 2022 he scored against Chernihiv at the Yunist Stadium in Chernihiv.

References

External links
 
 
 

2001 births
Living people
Sportspeople from Dnipropetrovsk Oblast
Ukrainian footballers
Association football defenders
FC Dnipro players
SC Dnipro-1 players
FC Nikopol players
FC Skoruk Tomakivka players
Ukrainian First League players
Ukrainian Second League players
Ukrainian Amateur Football Championship players